Wilbraham Egerton (1 September 1781 – 25 April 1856) was a British landowner and Member of Parliament from the Egerton family.

He was the eldest surviving son of William Tatton, later Egerton and educated at Eton College (1796) and probably Brasenose College, Oxford (1800). In 1806, he succeeded his father, inheriting the large Tatton Hall estate in north Cheshire. He completed the large country house built by his father and furnished it with furniture from Gillows of Lancaster and London.

He was a Captain in the Royal Cheshire militia in 1803, lieutenant-colonel in the Macclesfield regiment in 1809 and captain (1831) and then lieutenant-colonel in the King's Cheshire yeomanry (1831).

He was appointed High Sheriff of Cheshire for 1808–09 and elected MP for Cheshire in 1812, sitting until 1831.

He married his cousin Elizabeth, the daughter of Sir Christopher Sykes, 2nd Baronet of Sledmere House, Yorkshire, with whom he had 7 sons and 3 daughters. Their eldest son and heir, William Tatton Egerton, became the 1st Baron Egerton. A younger son, Edward Egerton, was an MP for Macclesfield and Cheshire East. He died in 1856.

References

 

1781 births
1856 deaths
Members of the Parliament of the United Kingdom for English constituencies
UK MPs 1812–1818
UK MPs 1818–1820
UK MPs 1820–1826
UK MPs 1826–1830
UK MPs 1830–1831
High Sheriffs of Cheshire
People educated at Eton College